Kahtuiyeh or Kahtuyeh
 Kahtuyeh, Fars (كهتويه - Kahtūyeh)
 Kahtuiyeh, Hormozgan (كهتويه - Kahtūīyeh)
 Kahtuiyeh, Kerman (كهتوييه - Kahtū’īyeh)